The Castilian Civil War was a war of succession over the Crown of Castile that lasted from 1351 to 1369. The conflict started after the death of king Alfonso XI of Castile in March 1350. It became part of the larger conflict then raging between the Kingdom of England and the Kingdom of France: the Hundred Years' War. It was fought primarily in Castile and its coastal waters between the local and allied forces of the reigning king, Peter, and his illegitimate brother Henry of Trastámara over the right to the crown.

Causes
Peter was called by his supporters "The Just" and by his detractors "The Cruel". To the higher ranks of the nobility, he was a tyrant, forcing the royal will on hitherto free men. He had greatly extended the royal authority and had entered into a war with the Crown of Aragon (called "The War of the Two Peters").

His illegitimate brother Henry quickly obtained the support of not only the upper noblesse, but France, Aragon, and the Papacy. In 1366, he officially deposed his brother as king of Castile, León, Toledo, and Seville and had himself proclaimed king in the monastery of Las Huelgas.

Conflict
In 1366, Henry, then living in France, assembled a large army, with both French and Aragonese components, at Montpellier and invaded Castile with the support of the kings of France and Aragon (Charles V and Peter IV respectively). He successfully forced Peter to flee.

Peter fled to Bayonne, a city in English-held Gascony. There, he petitioned Edward, the Black Prince, for aid and, in exchange for lands in Castile, received it. With English troops led by the prince, he returned to Castile and reasserted his royal power in 1367, forcing Henry to return to France after the successful Battle of Nájera (Navarette). He refused, however, to make good on his dealings with the English and his allies, including the Prince of Wales himself, soon left. In 1368, Henry and Charles of France signed the Treaty of Toledo whereby the Castilians lent a fleet in the Bay of Biscay to the French in return for military aid on land.

Henry entered Galicia, took some towns and then took the city of León in April. After this, the whole province of Galicia took sides with Henry. He reentered Castile in 1369 and murdered Peter after the Battle of Campo de Montiel. He was acclaimed Henry II and immediately solidified his rule by removing Jews from high office. Castile became, at this time, a stern ally of the French in their ongoing wars.

Sources
Wintle, Justin. The Rough Guide History of Spain. Penguin Group, 2003.

1350s conflicts
1360s conflicts
Conflicts of the Hundred Years' War
Wars involving the Crown of Aragon
Civil wars involving the states and peoples of Europe
Civil wars of the Middle Ages
1360s in Europe
Wars of succession involving the states and peoples of Europe
14th century in Castile